Parasinilabeo longiventralis is a species of cyprinid fish endemic to the Fuchuanjiang River in China.

References

Fish described in 2007
Parasinilabeo